Maxime Bernauer (born 1 July 1998) is a French professional footballer who plays as a right-back for Ligue 2 club Paris FC.

Club career
A youth product of Hennebont, Lorient, Montagnarde, and Rennes, Bernauer began his senior career with the reserves of Rennes. He started his career as a centre-back, but proved a utility player capable of playing right-back and as defensive midfielder. After Rennes, he played in the Championnat National with Concarneau and Le Mans. On 13 July 2021, he transferred to Paris FC until June 2024. He made his professional debut with Paris FC in a 4–0 league win over Grenoble on 24 July 2021.

International career
Bernauer is a youth international for France, having represented the France U16s and U17s.

References

External links
 
 FFF Profile

1998 births
Living people
People from Hennebont
French footballers
France youth international footballers
Association football fullbacks
Stade Rennais F.C. players
Le Mans FC players
Paris FC players
Ligue 2 players
Championnat National players
Championnat National 2 players
Championnat National 3 players
Sportspeople from Morbihan
Footballers from Brittany